Epiphanis is a genus of false click beetles in the family Eucnemidae. There are at least two described species in Epiphanis.

Species
These two species belong to the genus Epiphanis:
 Epiphanis cornutus Eschscholtz, 1829 g b
 Epiphanis tristis (Sharp, 1908) i c g
Data sources: i = ITIS, c = Catalogue of Life, g = GBIF, b = Bugguide.net

References

Further reading

External links

 

Elateroidea
Elateroidea genera